The Bentley Arena is an ice hockey arena on the campus of Bentley University in Waltham, Massachusetts. It is home to the Bentley Falcons men's ice hockey program, replacing the previous facility, the John A. Ryan Arena. The first hockey game was on February 16, 2018 with Bentley taking on Army West Point. The total capacity for hockey games is 2,240.

The 76,000 square foot facility was designed by Architectural Resources Cambridge and built by Suffolk Construction. Ground broke on the Arena in the summer of 2016, and was completed in February 2018.

In May 2018, the Arena was awarded an LEED Platinum rating, the highest possible rating for sustainability, according to the U.S. Green Building Council.

Since opening, the arena has hosted various events, such as Bentley's annual Spring Day concert.

Notable games

References

2018 establishments in Massachusetts
Bentley Falcons men's ice hockey
College ice hockey venues in the United States
Indoor ice hockey venues in Massachusetts
Sports venues completed in 2018
Buildings and structures in Waltham, Massachusetts
Sports venues in Middlesex County, Massachusetts